Old North Cemetery may refer to a location in the United States:
(sorted by state, then city/town)

 North Graveyard, also known as the Old North Cemetery, in Columbus, Ohio
 Old North Cemetery (Hartford, Connecticut), listed on the National Register of Historic Places (NRHP) in Hartford County
 Old North Cemetery (Truro, Massachusetts), listed on the NRHP in Barnstable County
 Old North Cemetery (Concord, New Hampshire), listed on the NRHP in Merrimack County
 Old North Cemetery (Portsmouth, New Hampshire), listed on the NRHP in Rockingham County

See also
 Old Cemetery, Somerville, Massachusetts
 North Cemetery (disambiguation)
 Old North (disambiguation)
 Cemetery (disambiguation)